Butten is a surname. Notable people with the surname include:

Anwen Butten (born 1972), Welsh international bowls competitor
William Butten (died 1620), servant of Samuel Fuller